Daulaghat is a small village in Chauna Gram Panchayat, Block Hawalbagh, Almora district, Uttarakhand.

Total population of Daulaghat is 250-400 with 150-200 male and 100-150 women. There is a market. www.knowurculture.com is a website for Daulaghat.

Schools

Government Intercollege of Daulaghat
Gopeshwar Mahadev School
Kanya Vidyalay

Hospitals

Government Hospital of Daulaghat
Veterinary Hospital

References

Villages in Almora district